Keyth Talley (born March 13, 1990 – October 23, 2019) was a United States sprinter who specialized in the 100 and 200 meters races. Talley spent his freshman and sophomore year at the University of North Texas and his junior and senior seasons at Louisiana State University.

In his freshman year at North Texas, Talley was named the Sun Belt Conference Freshman of the Year in both the indoor and outdoor seasons, the only male athlete to accomplish that feat in school history. He also became the first athlete in North Texas history to win gold at the National Junior Championship, winning the 200-meter dash (20.86).

At the 2009 Pan American Junior Athletics Championships in Port of Spain, Trinidad and Tobago, Talley won a silver medal in the 200 meters with a personal best of 20.78 seconds. He also helped the U.S. squad to a gold medal in the 4×100 meters relay. Talley was the first North Texas Mean Green athlete to medal at the Pan American Junior Athletics Championships.

References

External links

DyeStat profile for Keyth Talley
LSU Tigers bio
North Texas Mean Green bio

1990 births
2019 deaths
American male sprinters
North Texas Mean Green
LSU Tigers track and field athletes